Saint-Martin-de-Ré (literally Saint-Martin of Ré; Saintongeais: Sént-Martin-de-Ré) is a commune in the western French department of Charente-Maritime.

It is one of the ten communes located on the Île de Ré.

The fortifications in Saint-Martin-de-Ré, drawn up by Vauban between 1681 and 1685, were inscribed on the UNESCO World Heritage List in 2008 for their testimony to Vauban's work and its influence on military strategy and architecture over the subsequent 200 years.

History

Fortifications 

Saint-Martin-de-Ré has extensive fortifications, reflecting the strategic importance of the Île de Ré. During the Huguenot Rebellions of the 1620s, Cardinal Richelieu ordered that the island be fortified as a counterweight to the nearby Protestant city of La Rochelle on the French mainland. This included a citadel at Saint-Martin. After La Rochelle had been subdued, Saint-Martin's fortifications were largely demolished to remove its potential threat to royal power.

In 1627, an English invasion force under the command of George Villiers, Duke of Buckingham attacked the island in order to relieve the Siege of La Rochelle. After three months of combat in the Siege of Saint-Martin-de-Ré against the French under Marshal Toiras, the Duke was forced to withdraw in defeat.

Later, in the 1670s, the French engineer, Vauban was commissioned to review and overhaul the island's defences and, as a result, Saint Martin was enclosed by extensive and modern walls and embankments. This was done in three major phases ending in 1702 and the end result was an enclosed town capable of housing the island's population for a long siege.

Prison to the penal colonies 
Between 1873 and 1938, the prison in Saint-Martin-de-Ré kept prisoners before they were shipped to the penal colonies in French Guiana or New Caledonia. See penal colonies on Ré Island .

Population
The population of the commune has remained steady since 1800, although it was considerably larger during the French Revolution and dipped below 2000 from the 1920s to the 1940s.

The commune is the fifth-largest town on the island. With La Flotte, it forms a small urban area.

Gallery

Personalities
Nicolas Baudin, sailor and explorer

See also
Ernest Cognac Museum
Communes of the Charente-Maritime department

References

External links

 Saint-Martin-de-Ré Tourism Office
 Île de Ré and Ernest Cognacq museums
 Vauban fortifications
 Fortified-places.com

Communes of Charente-Maritime
Aunis
Charente-Maritime communes articles needing translation from French Wikipedia
Vauban fortifications in France